Felix Teodor Hamrin (14 January 1875 – 27 November 1937) was a Swedish politician. He was the leader of the liberal Freeminded People's Party and served as Prime Minister of Sweden from August to September 1932.

Hamrin was born in Mönsterås in Kalmar County. His father was a dealer in leather. He married Elizabeth "Lizzie" Pennycock in 1900. They had seven children.

After studying at a business school in Gothenburg, he ran a wholesaling business in Jönköping from 1903 to 1930. He entered the Riksdag at the young age of 37, and under Carl Gustaf Ekman he served as Minister of Commerce and Industry from 1926 to 1928 and as Minister of Finance from 1930 to 1932. When Ekman was forced to resign shortly before the elections in 1932 due to the Kreuger crash, Hamrin became prime minister. He resigned after the election because the Freeminded People's Party had suffered serious losses in the election. His term of office was only 50 days, giving him the record for serving the shortest amount of time as prime minister of Sweden.

He served briefly as party leader for the Freeminded People's Party after Ekman, and in the newly formed People's Party until a new party leader was chosen in January 1935. He also served as the governor of Jönköping County from 1930 to 1937. His most important political tasks were to fight the economic effects of the early years of the Depression in Sweden through severe economy measures, and to mitigate the effects of the Kreuger crash.

He died in Jönköping on 27 November 1937.

References 

1875 births
1937 deaths
People from Mönsterås Municipality
Liberal Party of Sweden politicians
Free-minded National Association politicians
Liberals (Sweden) politicians
Members of the Första kammaren
Prime Ministers of Sweden
County governors of Sweden
Swedish Ministers for Finance